R.R. Virdi is an American urban fantasy author. Two of his novels have been nominated for a Dragon Award: Grave Measures in 2016 and Dangerous Ways in 2017. His novelette, "Messenger" (co-authored with Yudhanjaya Wijeratne), was nominated for a Nebula Award in 2019.

Career 
R.R. Virdi's first novel, Grave Beginnings, was published as an ebook in December 2013. It was edited and rereleased in November 2015 in trade paperback format, after which it was named the "book of the year" by Drop of Ink Review that year. The short work "Chance Fortunes" was published in September 2015 in The Longest Night Watch charity anthology edited by Lacey Sutton. "A Bag Full of Stars" was published in Stardust, Always from Writers Colony Press in June 2016.

In 2016, Grave Measures was nominated for a Dragon Award in the Best Fantasy Novel category. Virdi's short, "Chance Dealings", was released in The Longest Night Watch, Volume 2 in October 2016. Dangerous Ways was released in December, and was nominated for a 2017 Dragon Award in the Best Fantasy Novel category. The third book in The Grave Report series, Grave Dealings, was released in October 2017.

The first novel in his Monster Slayer Online LitRPG fantasy series, Goblin King, was published in May 2018 as an ebook. "Messenger", a short work co-authored with Yudhanjaya Wijeratne and published October 2018 in The Expanding Universe Volume 4 military science fiction anthology, was nominated for the Nebula Award for Best Novelette in 2019. In March 2019, Virdi published his space opera novel, Star Shepherd, followed in July by Beast Queen, the sequel to Goblin King.

Virdi published a second story with Wijeratne, "A Little Bit of Kali", in The Expanding Universe Volume 5 in September that year, then co-edited the Parallel Worlds: The Heroes Within anthology with L. J. Hachmeister in October. His story, "The Shadow of Markham", was included in that anthology. Kate Pickford included his story "The Path to Kahinae" in the Hellcats anthology in September 2020.

Works
Unless otherwise noted, works are published independently by the author.

The Books of Winter 
An urban fantasy series.
Dangerous Ways (December 2016)

The Grave Report 
An urban fantasy detective series.
Grave Beginnings (December 2013 as ebook only, November 2015 in print)
Grave Measures (April 2016)
Grave Dealings (October 2017)

Monster Slayer Online 
Set in a virtual fantasy world.
Goblin King (May 2018, ebook) 
Beast Queen (July 2019, ebook)

Shepherd of Light
A space opera series.
Star Shepherd (March 2019)

Tales of Tremaine
An epic fantasy series.
The First Binding (forthcoming August 2022, Tor Books)

As editor
Parallel Worlds: The Heroes Within with L. J. Hachmeister (October 2019, Source 7)

Short works
"Chance Fortunes" in The Longest Night Watch edited by Lacey Sutton (September 2015, Writers Colony Press)
"A Bag Full of Stars" in Stardust, Always edited by Lacey Sutton, Andrew Barber, and Ashlee Hetherington (June 2016, Writers Colony Press)
"Chance Dealings" in The Longest Night Watch, Volume 2 (October 2016, Writers Colony Press)
"Cheaters and Fortunes" in The Longest Night Watch, Volume 2
"The Shadow of Markham" in Parallel Worlds: The Heroes Within edited by R. R. Virdi and L. J. Hachmeister
"The Path to Kahinae" in Hellcats edited by Kate Pickford (September 2020, ebook only)

Awards and honors

References 

Living people
American fantasy writers
Year of birth missing (living people)